In the Land of the Giants is an album by saxophonist Eric Kloss which was recorded in 1968 and released on the Prestige label.

Reception

AllMusic reviewer Scott Yanow stated: "A superior post-bop altoist, the blind Kloss showed that he was able to hold his own with musicians much better-known than himself".

Track listing 
All compositions by Eric Kloss, except as indicated
 "Summertime" (George Gershwin, Ira Gershwin, DuBose Heyward) - 7:31  
 "So What" (Miles Davis) - 11:01  
 "Sock It to Me Socrates" - 5:14  
 "When Two Lovers Touch"  - 5:14  
 "Things Ain't What They Used to Be" (Mercer Ellington, Ted Persons) - 5:33

Personnel 
Eric Kloss - alto saxophone
Booker Ervin - tenor saxophone
Jaki Byard - piano
Richard Davis - bass
Alan Dawson  - drums

References 

1969 albums
Eric Kloss albums
Prestige Records albums
Albums produced by Don Schlitten